Dendrotrophe is a genus of flowering plants belonging to the family Santalaceae.

Its native range is Southern China, Tropical Asia to Northern Queensland.

Species:

Dendrotrophe amorpha 
Dendrotrophe buxifolia 
Dendrotrophe granulata 
Dendrotrophe platyphylla 
Dendrotrophe umbellata 
Dendrotrophe varians

References

Santalaceae
Santalales genera